The Window is a studio album by American jazz vocalist Cécile McLorin Salvant. She is accompanied by pianist Sullivan Fortner.

Critical reception

Hank Shteamer of Rolling Stone wrote, "The most radical thing a jazz singer could do in 2018 is stick to the basics. One might expect Cécile McLorin Salvant, who picked up Best Jazz Vocal Album Grammys for each of her past two albums and is riding a wave of mainstream acclaim, to team with a buzzy producer or attempt some other kind of savvy crossover. But on The Window, the wise, virtuosic and subtly subversive 29-year-old singer opts for a setting so stark it can almost seem abstract..."

A Pitchfork review by Stephen M. Deusner noted, "Among Salvant’s most distinguishing artistic traits is how she makes those tonal shifts not just exciting but meaningful. Her craft is undeniable, but built into her craft is the freshness of encountering each tune as though for the first time, figuring it out in the moment from one note to the next. She sings in conversation with every song, its lyrics, and its historical context. Salvant accomplishes that not only by using her voice to comment on lyrics while she delivers them but also by developing a diverse, daring repertoire. On The Window, she sings French cabaret, American showtunes, pop standards, and deep soul and blues cuts."

Chris Willman of Variety observed, "This one is an album-length vocal/piano duet. But “minimalist” isn’t a word that will come to mind: Fortner is agreeably insane enough as a player that he doesn’t just sound like a full band, he sounds like two bands playing at once. And the frontwoman is the very farthest thing from a musical shrinking violet. There are quiet moments in “The Window,” but they're outweighed by the frantic ones, so if the stripped-down format suggests something polite, think again: McLorin Salvant and her accompanist are majestic and unhinged in equal measure."

References

2018 albums
Cécile McLorin Salvant albums
Albums recorded at the Village Vanguard